Antonio Petrović (born 24 September 1982) is a water polo player from Montenegro. He was part of the Montenegrin team at the 2012 and 2016 Summer Olympics.

See also
 List of World Aquatics Championships medalists in water polo

References

External links
 

Montenegrin male water polo players
Living people
1982 births
Olympic water polo players of Montenegro
Water polo players at the 2012 Summer Olympics
Water polo players at the 2016 Summer Olympics
World Aquatics Championships medalists in water polo